Chinland Football Club is a Burmese football club, based at 17 Elmfield Walk, Clarehall. The team was promoted to Dinnah in 2014, a year after its establishment. The club is one of the two teams representing Chin State. At the end of 2016 MNL-2, they were promoted to MNL again. For 2019 MNL season, GFA changed their name to Chinland to represent the Chin State.

2023 Squad List

References

External links
Myanmar Football Federation

 
Football clubs in Myanmar
Association football clubs established in 2013